The North Metropolitan Region is a multi-member electoral region of the Western Australian Legislative Council, located in the north-western and western suburbs of Perth. It was created by the Acts Amendment (Electoral Reform) Act 1987, and became effective on 22 May 1989 with seven members who had been elected at the 1989 state election three months earlier. At the 2008 election, it was decreased to six members.

Legislation to abolish the region, along with all other Western Australian Electoral Regions was passed in November 2021, with the 2025 state election to use a single state-wide electorate of 37 members.

Geography
The Region is made up of several complete Legislative Assembly districts, which change at each distribution.

Representation

Distribution of seats

|}

Members
Since its creation, the electorate has had 22 members. Five of these members had previously been members of the Legislative Council—Joe Berinson and Sam Piantadosi (both North Central Metropolitan), Graham Edwards and Bob Pike (both North Metropolitan) and Max Evans (Metropolitan).

Election Results

2021

2017

References

North Metropolitan